Pettancylus clessiniana is a species of mollusc belonging to the family Planorbidae. 

It is native to Western Europe.

References

 Brown D.S. (1994). Freshwater snails of Africa and their medical importance, 2nd edition. London: Taylor and Francis, 607 p

Planorbidae
Gastropods described in 1882